Deh Gap-e Mahmudi (also Romanized as Deh Gap-e Maḩmūdī; also known as Deh-e Gap and Deh Gap) is a village in Doshman Ziari Rural District, Doshman Ziari District, Mamasani County, Fars Province, Iran. At the 2006 census, its population was 609, in 167 families.

References 

Populated places in Mamasani County